Bermudian Americans are Americans of full or partial Bermudian ancestry.

Notable people

Sasha Allen
G. K. Butterfield
Michael Douglas
Stephen Hopkins
Norman Lewis (artist)
Andy Newmark
Albert Alexander Smith
Eugenius Harvey Outerbridge
Reggie Pearman
Edgar Toppin

References 

 
 
Caribbean American